Dodd Homestead was a historic home and farmstead located near Rehoboth Beach, Sussex County, Delaware. It was a modified "L"-shaped, wood frame dwelling, the earliest portion of which dated to about 1830.  The main house was a long, rectangular, two-story, single-pile structure in a vernacular Federal / Greek Revival style.  It had a wing, that was originally one-story. but later raised to a full two-stories, probably in the mid-19th century. There was also a two-story rear wing. The house was sheathed in hand-hewn cypress shingles and had stuccoed brick interior end chimneys.  Contributing 19th century outbuildings included a low brick ash shed, milk house, wood shed, storage shed, a small shed-roofed poultry house, stable, barn, a large gable-roofed dairy barn, corn crib, and carriage house.

It was added to the National Register of Historic Places in 1982. It is listed on the Delaware Cultural and Historic Resources GIS system as demolished or destroyed.

References

Farms on the National Register of Historic Places in Delaware
Federal architecture in Delaware
Greek Revival houses in Delaware
Houses completed in 1830
Houses in Sussex County, Delaware
Rehoboth Beach, Delaware
1830 establishments in Delaware
National Register of Historic Places in Sussex County, Delaware